Veľký Ďur is a village and municipality in the Levice District in the Nitra Region of Slovakia.

History
In historical records the village was first mentioned in 1205.

Geography
The village lies at an altitude of 190 metres and covers an area of 22.02 km². It has a population of about 1320 people.

Ethnicity
The village is about 96% Slovak and 4% Magyar.

Facilities
The village has a public library, gym, church and football pitch. It also has its own birth registry office.

External links
https://web.archive.org/web/20070513023228/http://www.statistics.sk/mosmis/eng/run.html

Villages and municipalities in Levice District